This is a partial list of molecules that contain 3 carbon atoms.

See also
 Carbon number
 List of compounds with carbon number 2
 List of compounds with carbon number 4

C03